The Alaskan Malamute is a large breed of dog that was originally bred for its strength and endurance to haul heavy freight as a sled dog and hound. It is similar to other arctic breeds such as the husky, the spitz, the Greenland Dog, Canadian Eskimo Dog, the Siberian Husky, and the Samoyed.

Lineage 
Although it is believed that the first dogs arrived in the Americas 12,000 years ago, people and their dogs did not settle in the Arctic until the Paleo-Eskimo people 4,500 years ago, followed by the Thule people 1,000 years ago, with both originating from Siberia. Malamutes were thought to be bred by the Malimiut Inupiaq people of Alaska's Norton Sound region.

The Malamute has been identified as a basal breed that predates the emergence of the modern breeds in the 19th century. A study in 2013 showed that the Alaskan Malamute has a similar east Asian origin to, but is not clearly related to, the Greenland Dog and the Canadian Eskimo Dog, but contains a possible admixture of the Siberian Husky.

In 2015, a study using several genetic markers indicated that the Malamute, the Siberian Husky, and the Alaskan husky share a close genetic relationship between each other and were related to Chukotka sled-dogs from Siberia. They were separate from the two Inuit dogs, the Canadian Eskimo Dog and the Greenland Dog. In North America, the Malamute and the Siberian Husky both had maintained their Siberian lineage and had contributed significantly to the Alaskan husky, which showed evidence of crossing with European breeds that was consistent with this breed being created in post-colonial North America. DNA extracted from a 9,500-year-old dog, Zhokhov, named after the Siberian island, was found to have shared a common ancestor with the Greenland sledge dog, the Alaskan Malamute and the Siberian Husky.

Appearance 

There is often a marked size difference between males and females.

The coat of the Alaskan Malamute is a double coat. The undercoat has an oily and woolly texture and can be as thick as two inches. The outer guard coat is coarse and stands off the body longer at the withers but not more than one inch off the sides of the body. Ears are small in proportion to the head and stand firmly erect when at attention. The Alaskan Malamute is a heavy dog, with a more formidable nature and structure than the Siberian Husky, which is bred for speed. The Alaskan Malamute is bred for power and endurance, which is its original function and what the standard of the breed requires of Alaskan Malamute breeders.

The usual colors are various shades of grey and white, sable and white, black and white, seal and white, red and white, or solid white. There are a wide range of markings in the breed including face markings, blazes, a splash at the nape of the neck, and a collar or half collar. White is often the predominant color on the body, parts of the legs, feet, and part of the markings of the face. In terms of color variants, some Malamutes exhibit a dark grey to buff-colored undertone around their trimmings and white areas, presenting with a color-linked gene known as Agouti. Two agouti alleles, with the possibility of a third, appear to be found in Malamutes: aw (Agouti Pattern or Wolf/Wild Pattern), at (Tan Point Pattern or Black Pattern), and awat (Heterozygous Agouti or Dark Agouti).

The eyes of the Alaskan Malamute are almond-shaped and are varied shades of brown; however, the darker eye is preferred. Purebred Alaskan Malamutes will not have blue eyes. The physical build of the Malamute is compact and strong with substance, bone and snowshoe feet.

According to the AKC breed standard, the Malamute's tail is well furred and is carried over the back like a waving plume. Corkscrew tails are occasionally seen but are faulted in the AKC breed standard (a corkscrew tail is commonly seen in the Akita). The Malamutes well-furred tails aid in keeping them warm when they curl up in the snow. They are often seen wrapping the tail around their nose and face, which presumably helps protect them against harsh weather such as blowing snow. Their ears are generally upright, wedge-shaped, small in proportion to the head and set to the side of the skull. The muzzle is deep and broad, tapering slightly from the skull to the nose. Nose and gums are black but some Malamutes have a snow nose, which is black with a pink undertone that can get darker or lighter, depending on the season.

Temperament 

Alaskan Malamutes are still in use as sled dogs for personal travel, hauling freight, or helping move light objects; some, however, are used for the recreational pursuit of sledding, also known as mushing, as well as for skijoring, bikejoring, carting, and canicross. However, most Malamutes today are kept as family pets or as show or performance dogs in weight pulling, dog agility, or packing. Malamutes are generally slower in long-distance dog sled racing against smaller and faster breeds, so their working usefulness is limited to freighting or traveling over long distances at a far slower rate than required for racing. They can also help move heavy objects over shorter distances.

Malamutes, like other Northern and sled dog breeds, can have a high prey drive, due to their origins and breeding. This may mean that in some cases they will chase smaller animals, including other canines, as well as rabbits, squirrels, and cats. While Malamutes are, as a general rule, particularly amicable around people and can be taught to tolerate smaller pets, it is necessary to be mindful of them around smaller animals and small children.

Malamutes are very fond of people, a trait that makes them particularly sought-after family dogs, but unreliable watchdogs as they do not tend to bark. Malamutes are nimble around furniture and smaller items, making them ideal house dogs, provided they get plenty of time outdoors meeting their considerable exercise requirements. Alaskan Malamutes also often participate in animal therapy programs, like visiting patients in hospitals, due to their soft nature. If they are year-round outdoor dogs, letting them play in a baby pool filled with cold water in summer keeps them cool. In the winter, they prefer snow.

Malamutes are usually quiet dogs, seldom barking. When a Malamute does vocalize, it often appears to be "talking" by vocalizing a "woo woo" sound. A similar-looking Spitz dog, the Siberian Husky, is much more vocal.

Health 

There is only one known health survey of Alaskan Malamutes, a 2004 UK Kennel Club survey with a small sample size of 14 dogs. The median lifespan of 10.7 years measured in that survey is typical of a breed their size; however, this study had a sample size too small to be considered reliable, and much anecdotal evidence suggests they have on average one of the longest lifespans of large dogs, up to 15 years. The major cause of death was cancer (36%).

The most commonly reported health problems of Alaskan Malamutes, in the 2004 UK Kennel Club survey (based on a sample size of 64 dogs) were musculoskeletal (hip dysplasia), and hereditary cataracts. There are additional health issues in the breed, the origins of which are unknown, including seizure disorders, found in young puppies as well as adults, epilepsy, congenital heart problems, kidney problems and skin disorders.

Other health issues in Malamutes include elbow dysplasia, inherited polyneuropathy, osteochondrodysplasia, cerebellar hypoplasia, heart defects, and eye problems (particularly cataract and progressive retinal atrophy). A growing problem among arctic dog breeds, including the Alaskan Malamute, but especially their cousin, the Samoyed, is canine diabetes, with onset occurring typically in middle age (5 to 7 years).

Another health issue with Malamutes is zinc deficiency. This breed cannot easily absorb zinc, and infections, skin, and coat problems can arise.

Thyroid disorders are the most common hormonal issue in dogs, and hypothyroidism is common in Malamutes.

History 

The Alaskan Malamute had a prominent role with their human companions as a utilitarian dog, working, hunting, and living alongside humans. The dogs were renowned for their excellent hunting abilities and were used to hunt large predators such as bears. They also aided their owners in finding seals by alerting them to seal blowholes. The interdependent relationship between the Malamute and their dogs fostered prosperity among both and enabled them to flourish in the inhospitable land above the Arctic Circle.

For a brief period during the Klondike Gold Rush of 1896, the Malamute and other sled dogs became extremely valuable to recently landed prospectors and settlers and were frequently crossbred with imported breeds. 

The Malamute dog has had a distinguished history; aiding Rear Admiral Richard Byrd to the South Pole, and the miners who came to Alaska during the Gold Rush of 1896, as well as serving in World War II primarily as search and rescue dogs in Greenland, although also used as freighting and packing dogs in Europe. This dog was never destined to be a racing sled dog; it was used for heavy freighting, pulling hundreds, perhaps thousands of pounds of supplies to villages and camps in groups of at least four dogs for heavy loads.

The University of Washington's Husky mascot is an Alaskan Malamute.

In 2010 the Alaskan Malamute was named the official state dog of Alaska.

Lathrop High School in Fairbanks, Alaska uses a Malamute as its official mascot.

Research 
In 2018, researchers at the University of Washington recorded the behavior of an Alaskan Malamute by attaching sensors to its paws, torso and tail, allowing them to capture its normal movements. The data was entered into a machine learning system with the aim of predicting the dog's behavior in various situations. The predictive ability of the software was only limited to short time frames, but it was able to identify "walkable" surfaces after observing the dog walk on, or avoid, certain surfaces.

See also 
 
 Dogs portal
 Chukotka Sled-Dog
 Alaskan Husky
 List of dog breeds
 Sled dogs

Footnotes

External links 

 

Dog breeds originating from Indigenous Americans
Dog breeds originating in the United States
FCI breeds
Sled dogs
Spitz breeds
Symbols of Alaska